Edgardo Alberto Adinolfi Duarte (born 27 March 1974) is a Uruguayan football coach and former player. He is the current assistant manager of Ecuadorian club Barcelona SC.

A left back, Adinolfi has played club football in Uruguay, Israel, Argentina, Cyprus and Spain.

International career
Adinolfi has won the Copa América 1995 with the Uruguay national team, scoring in the semifinal against Colombia. He played a total of 18 games for Uruguay between 1994 and 1997. He made his debut for Uruguay on October 19, 1994 in a friendly match against Peru (0-1 win) in the Estadio Nacional José Díaz in Lima, Peru.

References

External links 
  Profile and career data of Edgardo Adinolfi from tenfieldigital.com.uy
  Profile and statistics of Edgardo Adinolfi on Maccabi Haifa's official website
  Profile and career data from FootballPlus.com

1974 births
Living people
Footballers from Montevideo
Association football defenders
Uruguayan footballers
Uruguay under-20 international footballers
Uruguay international footballers
1995 Copa América players
1997 FIFA Confederations Cup players
Copa América-winning players
Uruguayan Primera División players
Argentine Primera División players
Cypriot First Division players
Club Atlético River Plate (Montevideo) players
Maccabi Haifa F.C. players
Peñarol players
Club de Gimnasia y Esgrima La Plata footballers
Defensor Sporting players
PAOK FC players
Centro Atlético Fénix players
Newell's Old Boys footballers
Pontevedra CF footballers
Tiro Federal footballers
Olympiakos Nicosia players
Uruguayan expatriate footballers
Expatriate footballers in Argentina
Expatriate footballers in Israel
Expatriate footballers in Spain
Expatriate footballers in Cyprus
Expatriate footballers in Greece
Uruguayan expatriate sportspeople in Spain
Uruguayan football managers
C.A. Cerro managers